Tony Edward Jones Sr. (May 24, 1966 – January 22, 2021) was an American professional football player who was an offensive tackle in the National Football League from 1988 to 2000. He started Super Bowl XXXII and Super Bowl XXXIII with the Denver Broncos. He was inducted into the Franklin County Sports Hall of Fame as a charter member on July 17, 1998.

His cousin DeMario Mayfield is a professional basketball player.

Jones died on January 22, 2021, at the age of 54.

References

External links
NFL.com player page

1966 births
2021 deaths
American football offensive tackles
Western Carolina Catamounts football players
Cleveland Browns players
Baltimore Ravens players
Denver Broncos players
American Conference Pro Bowl players
Western Carolina University alumni
People from Royston, Georgia
Players of American football from Georgia (U.S. state)
Ed Block Courage Award recipients